Karaköprü is a district and second level municipality in Şanlıurfa Province, Turkey. Its eponymous city center is slightly north from central Urfa. In the local elections of March 2019, Metin Baydilli was elected Mayor of Karaköprü. The current Kaymakam is Ufuk Akıl.

According to the 2012 Metropolitan Municipalities Law (Law No. 6360), all Turkish provinces with a population of more than 750,000, will become metropolitan municipalities and the districts within the metropolitan municipalities  will be second level municipalities. The law also creates new districts within the provinces in addition to present districts. 

Therefore, in 2014, the Şanlıurfa (Urfa) central district was split into three sections. The northern quarters of the city are named Karaköprü and the name Şanlıurfa are reserved for the metropolitan municipality.

See also 

 Gölpınar, Şanlıurfa

References

Districts of Şanlıurfa Province
Şanlıurfa
Kurdish settlements in Turkey